Anarsia procera is a moth in the family Gelechiidae. It was described by Kyu-Tek Park and Margarita Gennadievna Ponomarenko in 1996. It is found in Thailand.

The wingspan is about 16 mm. The forewings are creamy white, suffused with brown scales and a small, dark brown costal mark, as well as two triangular streaks on the costal margin from the base to the costal mark. There is a small dark brown streak near the base. The hindwings are grey.

References

procera
Moths described in 1996
Moths of Asia